Agustina García may refer to:
 Agustina Soledad García, Argentine field hockey player
 Agustina García (basketball), Argentine basketball player